Opportune may refer to:

 HMS Opportune (S20), an Oberon class submarine
 USS Opportune (ARS-41), a Bolster-class rescue and salvage ship

See also

 Opportunity (disambiguation)
 Sainte-Opportune